Revolutions is the third studio album by New York City DJ group The X-Ecutioners. The album was released on June 8, 2004 through Sony Records, and was produced by three members of The X-Ecutioners, including Rob Swift, Total Eclipse, and Roc Raida.

History
The album was semi-successful making it to #118 on the Billboard 200 and #50 on the Top R&B/Hip-Hop Albums. Three singles were released "Live from the PJs", "Like This" and "Back to Back". This would mark Rob Swift's last studio album with the group before he left in 2005 to focus on his solo career. "Like This" was also featured in SSX 3. Guest appearances on the album include Blue Man Group, Ghostface Killah, Trife, Scram Jones, Saigon, Cypress Hill, Rob Zombie, Slug, Josey Scott, Dead Prez, Fat Joe and Aasim.

"Let's Go", a collaboration with Good Charlotte, was recorded but was not featured on the album. However, the song appeared in the video game NFL Street.

Track listing

Chart performance

References

External links 
 The X-Ecutioners at Rolling Stone Magazine
 The X-Ecutioners at IGN Music

The X-Ecutioners albums
2004 albums
Albums produced by Scram Jones